Han Gyong-si (born 18 May 1954) is a North Korean weightlifter. He competed at the 1976 Summer Olympics and the 1980 Summer Olympics. At the 1980 Summer Olympics, he won the bronze medal in the flyweight event.

References

1954 births
Living people
North Korean male weightlifters
Olympic weightlifters of North Korea
Weightlifters at the 1976 Summer Olympics
Weightlifters at the 1980 Summer Olympics
Place of birth missing (living people)
Olympic bronze medalists for North Korea
Olympic medalists in weightlifting
Medalists at the 1980 Summer Olympics
Medalists at the 1974 Asian Games
Medalists at the 1978 Asian Games
Asian Games gold medalists for North Korea
Asian Games bronze medalists for North Korea
Weightlifters at the 1974 Asian Games
Weightlifters at the 1978 Asian Games
Asian Games medalists in weightlifting
20th-century North Korean people
21st-century North Korean people